"Enemy Mine" is a science fiction novella by American writer Barry B. Longyear. It was originally published in the September 1979 issue of  Isaac Asimov's Science Fiction Magazine. The novella's plot concerns two soldiers, one human and one reptilian-like alien, who find themselves stranded together on a hostile planet.

The story won the 1979 Nebula Award for Best Novella, as well as the 1980 Hugo Award for Best Novella, and was included by Longyear in his 1980 collection Manifest Destiny. It was followed by two sequels, "The Tomorrow Testament" and "The Last Enemy"; all three stories were included in Longyear's 1998 anthology The Enemy Papers (the version of "Enemy Mine" included in The Enemy Papers was labeled as "The Author's cut" and was significantly revised).

"Enemy Mine" was adapted into the 1985 film of the same name, directed by Wolfgang Petersen, starring Dennis Quaid and Louis Gossett Jr., and produced by 20th Century Fox. A novelization of the film was written by Longyear and David Gerrold and published that same year.

Plot summary
Willis Davidge, a human fighter pilot, is stranded along with Jeriba Shigan, a Drac, on a hostile planet. Dracs are a race of aliens which are reptilian in appearance and reproduce asexually. Davidge and Jeriba Shigan, whom Davidge nicknames "Jerry", initially attempt to kill one another but quickly realize that cooperation will be the key to their survival.

Awards and nominations
It won the 1979 Nebula Award for Best Novella and the 1980 Hugo Award for Best Novella.

Adaptations
In 1985, the novella was adapted into a film of the same name, produced by 20th Century Fox. The film is directed by Wolfgang Petersen and stars Dennis Quaid and Louis Gossett Jr. as Willis Davidge and Jeriba Shigan, respectively.

References

External links
 

1979 short stories
Science fiction short stories
Hugo Award for Best Novella winning works
Works originally published in Asimov's Science Fiction
Nebula Award for Best Novella-winning works
Extraterrestrial life in popular culture